Kraven may refer to:

Kraven the Hunter, a fictional comic book supervillain
Kraven the Hunter (Alyosha Kravinoff), a fictional comic book character and illegitimate son of the above-mentioned
Kraven (Underworld), a fictional vampire and main antagonist of the first Underworld film
Stratford Kraven Knits, former name of a baseball team based in Stratford, Ontario, Canada
Vanessa Kraven, a professional wrestler